Ruan Xiaoqi, also known as Ruan the Seventh, is a fictional character in Water Margin, one of the Four Great Classical Novels in Chinese literature. Nicknamed "Living King Yama", he ranks 31st among the 36 Heavenly Spirits, the first third of the 108 Stars of Destiny.

Background
The novel depicts Ruan Xiaoqi as having bulging eyes, pale yellow whiskers and dark patches on his skin, which make him look like a fearsome bronze statue. As this image is similar to that of the ruler of Hell in Chinese mythology, he is nicknamed "Living King Yama".

Ruan Xiaoqi is the youngest of the three Ruan brothers (his seniors being Ruan Xiaoer and Ruan Xiaowu). They live in Shijie Village (石碣村; in present-day Liangshan County, Shandong), where they make a living by fishing in waters near the Liangshan Marsh. Like his brothers, Ruan Xiaoqi is a good swimmer and fights well under water.

Becoming an outlaw
Wu Yong recommends involving the three Ruan brothers when Chao Gai, headman of Dongxi village in Yuncheng County, seeks his advice on whether to hijack valuables in transportation to the Grand Tutor Cai Jing in the imperial capital Dongjing. Visiting the Ruans in Shijie Village, Wu claims that he has come to buy some fish before proceeding to find out whether they are receptive to the bold proposal. Ruan Xiaoer, the oldest of the three, senses Wu is up to something else while the other two brothers, being less astute, are not suspicious. Nevertheless all three are unhappy with their poverty and resent being bullied by officials. So when Wu Yong comes to his point, they unanimously accept the invitation. The robbers, numbering seven including Liu Tang and Gongsun Sheng and with the help of Bai Sheng, who poses as a wine seller, succeed in seizing the valuables at the Yellow Mud Ridge by drugging the escorts of the gifts led by Yang Zhi. 

But the authorities soon track down essential clues and an arrest party is sent to seize Chao Gai at his house. Chao, Wu Yong, Gongsun Sheng and Liu Tang flee to Shijie village. The Ruan brothers, familiar with the surrounding waters, lure the soldiers who have come for them into the waterways and wipe them out. The seven men then seek refuge in the bandit stronghold of Liangshan Marsh. 

Wang Lun, the leader of Liangshan, tries to send them away with gifts fearing that they might usurp his position. Wu Yong, sensing Lin Chong's unhappiness with Wang, instigates him to kill the leader. Chao Gai is then elected the new chief of Liangshan, with Ruan Xiaoqi taking the eighth position. The Ruan brothers are appointed commanders of the Liangshan flotilla.

When Guan Sheng leads an imperial force to attack Liangshan, Zhang Heng launches a raid on his camp with a small band without informing any of the chieftains except Ruan Xiaoqi. He is ambushed and captured. Ruan takes some men to rescue him but is also seized. Both are freed after Guan Sheng defects to Liangshan.

Campaigns and death
Ruan Xiaoqi is appointed as one of the commanders of Liangshan's flotilla after the 108 Stars of Destiny came together in what is called the Grand Assembly. He participates in the campaigns against the Liao invaders and rebel forces in Song territory following amnesty from Emperor Huizong for Liangshan.

Ruan Xiaoqi's two elder brothers are killed in the campaign against Fang La. When Fang's palace falls, Ruan Xiaoqi finds the crown and the dragon robe of the rebel leader, which are symbols of an emperor, and puts them on out of mischief. He is reprimanded by Song Jiang for the lese majeste offence.

Back in Dongjing the remaining Liangshan heroes are each conferred a position. When it comes Ruan Xiaoqi's turn, Grand Marshal Gao Qiu and Grand Tutor Cai Jing raise objection citing his offence of putting on Fang La‘s "illegal" articles. Although Ruan Xiaoqi is let off on account of his service, he receives no reward. He goes back to Shijie Village where he lives happily to the age of 70.

In Peking Opera A Fisherman Kills A Family, part of The Qing Ding Pearl routine, Ruan Xiaoqi moved to the region of Lake Tai upon retirement from his military career, adopting the name Xiao En to avoid detection by his former enemies. Xiao En and his daughter became involved in a conflict against a local mafia boss; the father-daughter duo killed the mafia boss and went once again into pseudonymous exile.

Notes

Bibliography
 
 
 
 
 
 
 

36 Heavenly Spirits
Fictional fishers